The International Computer Music Conference (ICMC) is a yearly international conference for computer music researchers and composers. It is the annual conference of the International Computer Music Association (ICMA).

History
In 1986, the Institute of Sonology institute was moved to the Royal Conservatory of The Hague, hosting the International Computer Music Conference there during its inaugural year.

Each year there is a specific theme. For example, in 2007, the theme was "Immersed Music" and immersive media. ICMC 2007 took place in Copenhagen. On August 28, there was an "Underwater/Water Concert" at the DGI-byen swimcenter, in the hundred-metre DGI-byen pool, as well as the various other pools of the Vandkulturhuset.

This "Immersed Music" theme of ICMC 2007 explored important issues in musical instrument classification and immersion.

2014 40th ICMC is organised joint with the 11th Sound and Music Computing Conference in Athens, Greece 14–20 September 2014.

2017 43rd ICMC took place from  Oct 16, 2017 - Oct 20, 2017 in Shanghai, China. 2018 44th ICMC took place from 5–10 August 2018 in Daegu, Korea.

See also
List of electronic music festivals

References

External links

 CMA history
 ICMA – International Computer Music Association
 ICMC 2008, 2008 Conference website, hosted by the Sonic Arts Research Centre, Queen's University Belfast
 ICMC|SMC 2014, 2014 Conference website, hosted by the National and Kapodistrian University of Athens, the Institute for Research on Music & Acoustics and the Onassis Cultural Center.
 ICMC2016, 12–16 September 2016 in Utrecht, the Netherlands
 ICMC2018, 5–10 August 2018 in Daegu, Korea

Computer conferences
Computer music
Computer science conferences
Music conferences
Electronic music festivals in the United Kingdom
Electroacoustic music festivals
Music festivals established in 1974